A stadium buddy is an apparatus which consists of a collecting bag fastened around the leg and tubing that attaches to a condom catheter.  The hood attaches over the penis but, unlike a condom, has a plug for the tube where the condom's reservoir tip would normally be.  This apparatus allows an individual to "conveniently" urinate without having to make use of a restroom. Stadium buddies have been used by sports and concert attendees for over two decades, and are also used by pilots when flying aircraft too small to carry a restroom. Some aircraft have a tube in the seat for attaching to the condom catheter, and this tube drains out the bottom of the aircraft in flight.

External links
External links: *David Sedaris reads his essay about the Stadium Pal (Stadium Pal is a brand of stadium buddy.)

See also
External urine collection devices

References

Catheters
Urine